Igor Konstantinovich Belyaevski is a retired Kazakhstani professional ice hockey player.

Career statistics

External links

Living people
1963 births
Sportspeople from Almaty
Soviet ice hockey forwards
Kazakhstani ice hockey forwards
Kazakhstani people of Russian descent
Yenbek Almaty players
Kazzinc-Torpedo players
Avangard Omsk players
SKA Saint Petersburg players
Metallurg Novokuznetsk players
HC Izhstal players
HC Spartak Moscow players
HK Acroni Jesenice players
Rubin Tyumen players
Zauralie Kurgan players